HMS Sprightly was a 6-gun  built for the Royal Navy during the 1810s. She was wrecked off the Isle of Portland in 1821.

Description
The ship's tonnage was 140 tons burthen. The Nightingale class was armed with two 6-pounder cannon and four 6-pounder carronades. The ships had a crew of 34 officers and ratings.

Construction and career
Sprightly, the fourth ship of her name to serve in the Royal Navy, was ordered in 1817, laid down in October 1817 at Pembroke Dockyard, Wales, and launched on 3 June 1818. She was transferred to the Revenue Service in 1819 and completed on 18 January 1820 at Plymouth Dockyard. She was  driven ashore and wrecked at Portland, Dorset on 27 December 1820. Her crew were rescued by HMRC Greyhound and HMRC Scourge.

Notes

References

Nightingale-class cutter
1818 ships
Ships built in Pembroke Dock